The Recycler Tour was a concert tour by American rock band ZZ Top. Presented by Beaver Productions and sponsored by Miller Lite, the tour took place in North America and Europe. The set list featured material from the band's previous seven studio albums. Venues were mostly arenas.

Itinerary
The tour coincided with the October 1990 release of the band's album Recycler. The tour began on October 2, 1990 in Vancouver, British Columbia and ended on September 27, 1991 in Mexico City.

Bryan Adams, The Law, Thunder, and Little Angels were the opening acts for the show on July 6, 1991.'''

Opening Acts
 The Law
 Thunder
 Little Angels
 Black Crowes
 Extreme

Set list

Opening
John Farnham

Bryan Adams
 "She's Only Happy When She's Dancing"
 "Kids Wanna Rock"
 "Hey Honey – I'm Packin' You In!"
 "It's Only Love"
 "Can't Stop This Thing We Started"
 "Cuts Like a Knife"
 "Take Me Back"
 "Thought I'd Died and Gone to Heaven"
 "When the Night Comes"
 "Heat of the Night"
 "Heaven"
 "(Everything I Do) I Do It for You"
 "Run to You"
 "Somebody"
 "There Will Never Be Another Tonight"
 "Long Gone"
 "Summer of '69"
 "One Night Love Affair"
 "C'mon Everybody"

ZZ Top
 "Planet of Women"
 "Sleeping Bag"
 "Tell It"
 "Beer Drinkers & Hell Raisers"
 "Waitin' for the Bus"
 "Jesus Just Left Chicago"
 "I'm Bad, I'm Nationwide"
 "Ten Foot Pole"
 "Burger Man"
 "Gimme All Your Lovin'"
 "Concrete and Steel"
 "My Head's in Mississippi"
 "Manic Mechanic"
 "Heard It on the X"
 "Cheap Sunglasses"
 "2000 Blues"
 "Blue Jean Blues"
 "Just Got Paid"
 "Doubleback"
 "Got Me Under Pressure"
 "Sharp Dressed Man"
 "Give It Up"
 "Legs"
 "Tube Snake Boogie"
 "La Grange"
 "Tush"

Tour dates

References

ZZ Top concert tours
1990 concert tours
1991 concert tours